Pangora is a genus of moths in the family Erebidae from Nepal, India and Sri Lanka. The genus was erected by Frederic Moore in 1879.

Description
Palpi not projecting beyond the frons. Antennae almost simple in both sexes. Hind tibia with two pairs of spurs. Forewings are rather long and narrow.

Species
 Pangora coorgensis (Hampson, 1916)
 Pangora distorta Moore, 1879
 Pangora erosa (Walker, 1855)
 Pangora matherana Moore, 1879

References

External links

Spilosomina
Moth genera